WonderKing Online (Korean: 원더킹 Japanese: ワンダーキング) was a free-of-charge, 2D, side-scrolling massively multiplayer online role-playing game created by the South Korean company ToWinGames.

Gameplay
WonderKing was a MMORPG which centers on venturing throughout an expansive world, fighting various monsters in real-time combat, in a style that can be pleasantly associated with side-scrolling adventure platforms from the 32-bit genre. The players combat monsters and complete quests, in the process acquiring in-game currency called "Zed", experience points (EXP), and various items. Players can kill monsters alone, or they can form a party with up to five total characters. Loot is shared based on relative damage and level of characters in the party, more being awarded to the higher-level members.

WonderKing uses a 2D scrolling viewpoint similar to a platform game. The controls for the game are executed using the keyboard and mouse. The keyboard is used for many game functions, and much of it can be rearranged to suit users' needs. The mouse is mainly used to trigger non-player characters (NPCs) and manipulate items.

WonderKing characters exist in "servers." Players are allowed to create up to 3 characters in each server. Each server, similar in content between each other in the same version, is split into at most fifteen channels, among which characters are allowed to freely switch. Currently there is no way of transferring characters between servers.

Characters
At the character creation screen players choose what class they would like to play as. Beginning classes include Swordsman, Mage, Thief, and Scout. The Korean servers also include a robot-riding Machine class. New players begin on a map called Tutorial, as the name states, it explains to the player basic game commands. Further class progression is only allowed within the scope of the class chosen at character creation. The only time that the classes split again is during the first class advancement where each Swordsman, Mage, Thief, or Scout, must choose between two "sub-classes". A Swordsman can become either a Knight or Warrior. A Mage can become either a Priest or a Wizard. A Thief can become either a Rogue or Ninja, and a Scout can become either an Archer or Gunner.

In addition to combat statistics, characters have "attraction". Once characters reach level 15, they are able to raise the attraction of any other character once per day. A character cannot raise same character's attraction more than once per month.

Some WonderKing servers have a feature that tracks players total ranking, job ranking, and world ranking. Rank information is available from the region website of the player. Titles also exist for the North American version of WonderKing for the PvP system. PvP Titles are gained from experience rewarded from winning or losing PvP matches in a similar way to the leveling system.

The highest level in the game is currently 140, while Ignited Games is working on implementing the 3rd class skills. The current class skills go as follows: Beginner class skills, 1st Upgrade Skills at level 30, and 2nd Upgrade skills at level 80.

Guilds
Players can form Guilds with other players. Guild creation costs a certain amount of Zed, depending on the version being played and where the Guild Creation Item is bought from. The purpose of a guild is to be able to find and chat with others more easily, bond with other players, promote cooperation, and battle using teamwork. Members have their guild's name listed above their character name. A guild's size is determined by half the level of the guild master.

Quests
There are over a hundred available quests, each with varying prerequisites; most quests may require the player to have attained a certain level or to have completed another certain quest. Most available quests require the player to retrieve a certain amount of spoils attained from monsters or to traverse an obstacle course. Some quests can be repeated, although the reward(s) and given EXP may be different from those attained during their first completion.

Jump quests are a unique type of quest in which a character starts at one area of a map and uses timed jumps to get from one to another specific platform. Players attempt to avoid enemies and obstacles that can knock them off of the platforms. Unlike MapleStory, some skills, abilities, clothing, and items that increase jumping distance or speed have effect during these quests.

Economy
Items can be acquired from monster drops, purchased from other characters or shops, or obtained as rewards for completing a quest. These items are used for various purposes. Players are also able to trade items.

Since WonderKing is free, the developers introduced the Item Mall to generate revenue. This is a virtual shop where players can buy items using real money. Most Item Mall items expire after a certain period of time. Pets, modeled after animals, mythical creatures, and Zodiac signs, such as bunnies, dragons, and pandas follow the owner around and can be equipped to pick up spoils dropped by enemies. Mounts are also available from the Item Mall and require an item called Mount Fuel in order to be used. Mount Fuel is store bought and only lasts for a certain amount of time when used.

The Open Market is a place set aside for people who wish to sell their items amongst other players. Miniature shops can be set up in this area, allowing people to browse their stock. Snack Stalls, which are required to set up a shop, are available through certain Miscellaneous Item Selling NPCs as well as the Item Mall. One can meet with players located in other towns, provided the town contains an Open Market entrance. However, one cannot use the Open Market to travel between towns.

Real money trading between players is prohibited in WonderKing, and results in a ban. This includes trading Zed (ingame currency) with Gcoin Items (items bought with real money).

World

There are six main locations released so far in WonderKing. These locations include Elgaill Island, Francis, WonderPlus, Hellen Town, Nagpha Swamp, and Lamupel Highlands. The beginner-friendly island features low leveled monsters and short tutorial quests to introduce players to different aspects of gameplay. Players can take a boat from the Elgaill Docks located on the northern side of the Elgaill Island which will take them to the Francis Docks on the Francis map.

Unfortunately, Wonderking has been shut down because the staff of Ndoorsgames decided that there was not enough time to be given to the game in order to give it justice. With bugs and hackers running freely, Wonderking was shut down in late December. They announced that they would reopen it once they fixed it in the future.

Events
Events vary, some events only the top three or so will get a prize, usually an item of some sorts. Users are notified of an upcoming event by a scrolling box at the top of the game screen. Events are known to bring an influx of players to the event's respective locations, which generally causes massive connection lag and sometimes even disconnections. The large amount of special effects during an event can significantly slow down the player's PC.

Occasionally, certain versions of the game hold events that celebrate a certain event in real-life or an event specific to that version, such as a holidays or Facebook events. During these events, certain aspects of the game are modified in celebration; for example, the Wonder Day experience rate, Friends Referral event or special new items may be released.

Player vs. Player
In the North American version of WonderKing exists a PvP system. This system is still under development by Ignited Games. Players can face off against each other in 1v1 combat. There is also a Guild PvP feature under development which is often referred to as GvG . Players face off on certain maps only accessible from making a challenge with another player. There are a total of 4 maps and an option to randomly select the map. Damage that players do is nerfed when facing off on each other, but HP and MP is unchanged. It is pretty well balanced so that level difference does not affect the players chance to win. For example, a level 30 player has an equal chance to beat a level 100 player as the level 100 player to defeat the level 30 player. Currently there is also a Battleground system underdevelopment and an NPC named Benson appears to have a major role in this feature. There is only one Battleground map.

Transportation
In WonderKing, there is an NPC named Wapi who teleports players to towns and places for a certain price (in Zed). Wapi is in all the towns, but not all the locations that he can teleport players to. It is also important to know that not all prices are the same when traveling back and forth between the towns. Wapi also gives a discount for players below level 10.

Mining
This is one major implementation that WonderKing Online has that is separate from MapleStory (at least, until MapleStory's recent Chaos update), mining. Each player can purchase pick axes from the NPC named Dozer located near each Mining Site entrance. The Mining Site is a lot like how the Open Market works, players can enter from each town that has the portal to the Mining Site, but can not use the Mining Site to transverse between different towns. When Mining the player has to have pickaxes in their inventory which stack up to 10 per inventory slot. Each time a pickaxe is used (to start the mining process, by default, the key to press is 'B') a bar will appear showing number of pickaxes in inventory and loading bar. The loading bar tells the player how long until the next pickaxe will be used. Each pickaxe has a chance to find a mineral or ore, and it is also possible to find nothing, as well as finding more than one ore or mineral on the same pickaxe usage.

Monster Book
The Monster Book in WonderKing can be used to collect items called Monster Cards. Monster Cards drop from various monsters and there are certain cards for each level range. In order to complete a set of cards, a player must find parts A, B, and C to the set. Once this is completed a player can then use the three pieces to transform into the monster for a certain period of time. Players can also move around and fight in this costume. It will disappear upon death or once time runs out. Certain cards are also available from the Item Mall.  Applied transformations can be canceled anytime by pressing the "Cancel" button in the Monster Book tab.

Shutdown 
Due to legal problems which prevented the developers releasing new content such as classes, maps, and mobs, plus a massive amount of hackers & exploiters, IgnitedGames decided to temporarily close the game. Although they stated that the game would be available once everything is back to normal between Ignited and Ryu&Soft, WonderKing was shut down on 29 December 2011.

As of January 8, 2013, IgnitedGames stated that they are still under negotiation with Ryu&Soft and that the pair are in open communication.
As of July 11, 2019, IgnitedGames stated nothing.

References

External links
 WonderKing Online Ignited Games' Site – North American WonderKing Online (Shut Down)
 Wonderking 2 Gameheart' Site (Japanese)(Shut Down)
 Wonderking 2 Crazy Dog Game' Site (Thailand)(Shut Down)
 Wonderking 2 Game Chorus' Site (Korean)(Shut Down)

2007 video games
Massively multiplayer online role-playing games
Video games developed in South Korea
Windows games
Windows-only games
Side-scrolling video games
Inactive massively multiplayer online games